Jordan Case (born ) is a former Canadian football quarterback in the Canadian Football League who played for the Ottawa Rough Riders. He played college football for the North Texas Mean Green. In 2001, Case was inducted into the North Texas Athletics Hall of Fame.

References

1957 births
Living people
American football quarterbacks
Canadian football quarterbacks
Ottawa Rough Riders players
North Texas Mean Green football players